"Love in a Box" is a song recorded by Australian band Sunnyboys. It written by lead singer-guitarist, Jeremy Oxley and was released in March 1984 as the second single of the band's third studio album, Get Some Fun. "Love in a Box" peaked at No. 46 on the Kent Music Report singles chart.

Track listing
7" vinyl
 Side A "Love in a Box" - 3:21
 Side B "Physical Jerk" - 2:51

Charts

Release history

References

1984 singles
1983 songs
Sunnyboys songs
Mushroom Records singles